Neutrino experiments are scientific studies investigating the properties of neutrinos, which are subatomic particles that are very difficult to detect due to their weak interactions with matter. Neutrino experiments are essential for understanding the fundamental properties of matter and the universe's behaviour at the subatomic level. Here is a non-exhaustive list of neutrino experiments, neutrino detectors, and neutrino telescopes.

 Accelerator neutrino (AC), Active galactic nuclei neutrino (AGN), Atmospheric neutrino (ATM), Cosmic ray neutrino (CR), Low-energy solar neutrino (LS), Low-energy supernova neutrino (LSN), Pulsar neutrino (PUL), Reactor neutrino (R), Solar neutrino (S), Supernova neutrino (SN), Terrestrial neutrino (T).
 Double beta decay (BB), Charged current (CC), Elastic scattering (ES), Neutral current (NC).

See also
Aspera European Astroparticle network

References

External links
  Regularly updated index of neutrino physics research.